The Essential Backstreet Boys is the third compilation album by American pop group Backstreet Boys, released by RCA Records and Legacy Recordings as part of their Essential series. It was released on September 26, 2013 in the United Kingdom, and on October 22, 2013 in the United States. The album includes songs from the group's first seven studio albums, Backstreet Boys (1996), Backstreet's Back (1997), Backstreet Boys (U.S.) (1997), Millennium (1999), Black & Blue (2000), Never Gone (2005), Unbreakable (2007), and This Is Us (2009). It also includes the song "If You Stay" recorded for the 1997 film Booty Call, and "Drowning" from their first greatest hits compilation, The Hits – Chapter One (2001).

Critical reception
AllMusic gave the album 4 out of 5 stars, writing that "Essential Backstreet Boys traces this evolution, filling in a few more details of those early hit-making years, which makes this worthwhile for the dedicated fan, but many listeners may find either The Hits, or the variety of budget-line collections released since, to be a better bet as they contain the hits and nothing but."

Track listing

Charts

Release history

References

2013 greatest hits albums
Backstreet Boys albums